Goodstein is a surname. It is the surname of:
Anastasia Goodstein, American web content producer and author
David Goodstein (born 1939), American physicist, married to Judith
David B. Goodstein (1932–1985), American publisher and LGBT activist
Eban Goodstein (born 1960), American economist
Judith R. Goodstein (born 1939), American historian of science, married to David
Reuben Goodstein (1912–1985), English mathematician and philosopher of mathematics

Origins 
Goodstein is a part-translation from the name Gutstein, a German-origin name. with gut meaning good, and Stein meaning stone.

References